Bade (or Barde or Badde) is a Local Government Area in Yobe State, Nigeria. It has its headquarters in the town of Gashua.

Landscape 
It has an area of 772 km.

Population 
It has a total population of 139,782 at the 2006 census.

Postal code 
The postal code of the area is 631.

Languages 
The Bade and Duwai languages are spoken in Bade LGA.

See also 

 List of Local Government Areas in Yobe State

References

Local Government Areas in Yobe State